Luhansk Nature Reserve is an administrative collection of four individual national nature reserves of Ukraine.  Located in Luhansk Oblast, the easternmost province of Ukraine, the Luhansk reserves were affected by hostilities in the area in 2014.  Originally established as a strict reserve for conservation and scientific study, public access is prohibited.  The four components each exhibit a different aspect of the steppe ecology of eastern Ukraine.

The four sectors are:
 Stanichno-Luhansk Reserve.  Floodplain forest-steppe with some meadow steppe.  (498 hectares)
 Provallya Steppe Nature Reserve.  Grassland steppe with forest cover in deep ravines and river cuts.  (588 hectares)
 Striltsevsky Steppe Nature Reserve.  Characteristics of  grass-fescue-feather grass northern steppe.  (1,037 hectares)
 Trekhizbenskaya Steppe.  A subsidiary branch in Slavyanoserbsky and Novoaydarsky districts.  (3,281 hectares)

See also
 Lists of Nature Preserves of Ukraine (class Ia protected areas)
 National Parks of Ukraine (class II protected areas)

References

External links
 Boundaries of Luhansk Nature Reserve on OpenStreetMap.org (Trekhizbenskaya Steppe) 
 Boundaries of Luhansk Nature Reserve on ProtectedPlanet.net

Nature reserves in Ukraine